Alaoui is a surname. Notable people with the surname include:

Ahmed Alaoui (born 1949), Moroccan footballer
Amina Alaoui (born 1964), Moroccan musician
Princess Lalla Joumala Alaoui (born 1962), Moroccan diplomat
Leila Alaoui (1982–2016), French-Moroccan photographer and video artist
Morjana Alaoui (born 1983), Moroccan actress
Zakaria Alaoui (born 1966), Moroccan footballer